Sweden has the following national youth football teams:

 Sweden national under-21 football team 
 Sweden national under-20 football team (Only plays in the FIFA U-20 World Cup)
 Sweden national under-19 football team
 Sweden national under-17 football team

Youth